Connor McGovern (born April 27, 1993) is an American football center for the New York Jets of the National Football League (NFL). He played college football at Missouri and was drafted by the Denver Broncos in the fifth round of the 2016 NFL Draft.

Professional career

Denver Broncos
McGovern was drafted by the Denver Broncos in the fifth round of the 2016 NFL Draft with the 144th overall pick.

After not playing in his rookie season, McGovern played in 15 games, starting the final five games of the season at right guard in place of the injured Ronald Leary.

In 2018, McGovern was named the starting right guard to begin the season as Ronald Leary was moved to left guard after beating out incumbent starter Max Garcia. He was moved over to starting center in Week 11 following a season-ending injury to Matt Paradis, and started there the rest of the season.

In 2019, McGovern was named the starting center after Paradis left via free agency, starting all 16 games.

New York Jets
On April 2, 2020, McGovern signed a three-year, $27 million contract with the New York Jets. He started all 16 games at center in 2020.

McGovern entered the 2021 season as the Jets starting center. He suffered a knee injury in Week 16 and was placed on injured reserve on December 27.

Personal life
In 2020 Connor McGovern married Devin Dilling.

McGovern comes from an affluent family from Fargo, North Dakota, his grandfather Ron Offutt according to a Forbes article titled "The Sultan of Spuds" is one of the wealthiest people in North Dakota. Some of his family members include Griffin Neal (Cousin):, Keith McGovern (Father); President of RD Offutt Company and Ron Offutt (Grandfather). RD Offutt Farms is the primary supplier of frozen french fries for the McDonald's corporation.

References

External links
Denver Broncos bio
Missouri Tigers bio

1993 births
Living people
Players of American football from North Dakota
Sportspeople from Fargo, North Dakota
American football offensive linemen
Missouri Tigers football players
Denver Broncos players
New York Jets players